Gareth Higgins is a writer from Belfast, Northern Ireland now living in Asheville, North Carolina. He is the founding director of the Wild Goose Festival.

He is a graduate in sociology from Queen's University of Belfast (BA, PhD). He was a co-founder (in 1998) of the zero28 Project, a faith-based peace and justice initiative in Northern Ireland. He has written and spoken widely on religion and conflict, art and spirituality and film, with his work appearing in The Independent, The Irish Times, Sojourners, and Third Way Magazine, among others.

He appears regularly on BBC Radio, and he and Jett Loe co-present a film review podcast called 'The Film Talk'.

Selected publications
Anti-Catholicism in Northern Ireland, co-authored with John D Brewer (Palgrave, 1998)

How Movies Helped Save My Soul: Finding Spiritual Fingerprints in Culturally Significant Films (Relevant Books, 2003)

Religion, Civil Society, and Peace in Northern Ireland, co-authored by John D Brewer and Francis Teeney (Oxford University Press, 2011)

Cinematic States (Burnside Books, 2013)

Chapter in:
Researching the Troubles: Social Science Perspectives on the Northern Ireland Conflict (Mainstream, 2004)

Chapter in:
Artisans of Peace: Grassroots Peacemaking Among Christian Communities (Orbis, 2003)

Article on 'Free Presbyterianism' in The Encyclopaedia of Ireland (Gill & Macmillan, 2004)

How Not to Be Afraid: Seven Ways to Live When Everything Seems Terrifying (Canterbury Press Norwich, 2021)

External links
 Church of Ireland Gazette
 Higgins' blog
 The Film Talk
 Wild Goose Festival
 Cinematic States

Alumni of Queen's University Belfast
Christian writers
Living people
Male non-fiction writers from Northern Ireland
Writers from Belfast
Activists from Northern Ireland
21st-century writers from Northern Ireland
Year of birth missing (living people)